Madhushree Narayan (born 4 February 1999) is an Indian playback singer and a classical singer. She has received Kerala State Film Awards for Best Female Playback Singer in 2015 and 2019 and received Kerala Film Critics Award 2014.

Career

Madhushree has been singing from the age of three and began learning music formally from her father Pandit Ramesh Narayan and later from Pandit Jasraj. Presently, she is learning nuances and styles of Thumri from Pandit Ajay Pohankar. 

Madhushree started her career as a singer when she was just four, making her debut in Malayalam for the movie 'Makalkku'. She also made her debut as a playback singer under her father's baton in the yet-to-be-released Tamil film Oduthalam in 2011. She also lent her voice for songs in Edavappathy, Ennu Ninte Moideen, Adaminte Makan Abu,  Alif (2015 film), Makalkku, Ottamandaram , White Boys (2014), Paathi (2016)  and sung the tracks of many compositions of her father's. Also, she made her Kannada debut in 2017 for the movie Urvi (film).

Awards and honours

References 

1999 births
Living people
Bollywood playback singers
Malayalam playback singers
Indian women playback singers
Singers from Kannur
21st-century Indian singers
21st-century Indian women singers
Women musicians from Kerala
Film musicians from Kerala